Gustavo Cirillo (born April 23, 1961) is an Argentine sprint canoer who competed in the late 1980s. At the 1988 Summer Olympics in Seoul, he was eliminated in the repechages of both the K-2 500 m and K-4 1000 m events.

References
Sports-reference.com profile

1961 births
Argentine male canoeists
Canoeists at the 1988 Summer Olympics
Living people
Olympic canoeists of Argentina